Derek Gordon Thomas (born 20 July 1972) is a British politician and former property developer serving as the Member of Parliament (MP) for St Ives since the 2015 general election. He is a member of the Conservative Party.

Early life and career
Thomas was born in Cornwall to parents who were evangelical missionaries. He grew up in West Cornwall and went on to complete a traditional Cornish Mason Apprenticeship.

He studied in South London and then returned to West Cornwall to be a development manager for Mustard Seed, a voluntary organisation in Helston, Cornwall which helps in meeting of the needs of adults with learning disabilities on a day care basis, through provision of training in essential life skills with a view to greater integration within the community.  He later started his own small construction business as a property developer.

Political career
Thomas was first elected as a candidate for the Conservative Party at a by-election in November 2005 for Penzance Central ward on Penwith District Council. He narrowly beat the Liberal Democrat candidate and subsequently opposed the creation of a unitary Cornwall Council. In May 2009, he did not stand for the new Penzance Central ward on the amalgamated Cornwall Council and the seat was narrowly won by the Liberal Democrat candidate.

He unsuccessfully contested the parliamentary seat of St Ives for the Conservative Party at the 2010 general election, coming 1,719 votes behind the Liberal Democrat incumbent Andrew George. However, in the following general election in May 2015 he subsequently took the seat.

Thomas supported the Leave campaign in the 2016 European Union Referendum.

Thomas once again contested the St Ives seat in the 2017 general election, his campaign including a visit by Secretary of State for Environment, Food and Rural Affairs Andrea Leadsom to his Penzance office. He went on to be re-elected with an increased vote share, but a diminished majority of 312.

In April 2019, Thomas was criticised for saying that Cornwall has a National Park on the Lizard Peninsula during a debate he secured to discuss 'Effect of the 25 Year Environment Plan on World Health', when in fact the area is a National Nature Reserve and an Area of Outstanding Natural Beauty. Despite this error the debate was positively received by MPs and led to Thomas being invited to apply to the Environmental Audit Committee by its Chair Mary Creagh MP.

In May 2019, Cornish MPs received local scrutiny following release of expenses figures for that year, Thomas claimed £184,937, therefore making him Cornwall's "second most expensive MP" after Steve Double. Thomas said: "Having run my own business before being elected an MP, I am acutely aware of the need to keep a close eye on what is being spent. I constantly look at ways of reducing my expenses but believe my claims are very reasonable for an MP representing a constituency in the extreme south west of the country”.

In June 2019, Thomas supported the establishment of a Marine Conservation Zone west of Land's End, calling the move a "big step forward".

In the House of Commons, he sits on the Environmental Audit Committee and the Work and Pensions Select Committee having previously sat on both the Health and Social Care Select Committee and the Science and technology Select Committees.

Thomas is currently the Chair of the following All-Party Parliamentary Groups: Brain Tumours, Vascular and Venous Disease, and Axial Spondyloarthritis. As well as chairing those APPGs, Thomas is Vice Chair for the following APPG groups: Post Office Group, UK Islands Group and Home Electrical Safety Group (Vice Chair and Secretary). He is Secretary for the Healthy Homes and Buildings Group, and Treasurer for the Fuel Poverty and Energy Efficiency Group and also the South West Rail Group. He is a member of the Ocean Conservation Group, The Minimum Unit Pricing of Alcohol Group and the Great South West Alliance group.

In 2019, he was re-elected to Parliament, increasing his majority from 312 to 4,284.

His top areas of focus are tackling climate change and protecting biodiversity and the environment. This includes the development of the ‘WR2020 Project’ a woodland recovery project which has the aim of planting 20,000 trees in West Cornwall by the end of 2020. The project is set to improve air quality and create healthy environments for people to enjoy.

He backed Penny Mordaunt in the leadership contests in 2022.

Personal life
Derek Thomas lives in West Cornwall in the village of St Buryan with his wife Tamsin and their three young children.

References

External links

 
 Derek Thomas MP's website
 Derek Thomas UK Conservative Party website

1972 births
British Christians
Conservative Party (UK) MPs for English constituencies
Councillors in Cornwall
Living people
Members of the Parliament of the United Kingdom for St Ives
UK MPs 2015–2017
UK MPs 2017–2019
UK MPs 2019–present